The qama is a short Caucasian dagger. It has a long, wide double-edged blade and is native to the North Caucasus. The qama was also traditionally carried by the Cossacks who adopted it from the peoples of the Caucasus, and is commonly referred to as the "Cossack dagger". It resembles the Roman gladius and Scottish dirk.

As the Kabardian linguist Shagirov writes, the name of the dagger came from the Turkic languages (see, for example, Turkish kama "dagger", Karachay-Balkar qama "dagger").

References

European swords
Knives
Blade weapons